MEWA Hospital is a hospital in Mombasa, Kenya. It is a project of the Muslim Education and Welfare Association (MEWA) and provides in-patient (with a capacity of 60 beds) and out-patient services operating 24 hours a day.

References

External links
 https://web.archive.org/web/20110722131850/http://www.mewa.or.ke/mmc/med_board.php 
 https://web.archive.org/web/20110722132007/http://www.mewa.or.ke/aboutus.php 

Mombasa
Hospitals in Kenya
Hospitals established in 1992